Pirner is a German language habitational surname for someone from Pirna in Saxony or Birnau in Württemberg. Notable people with the name include:
 Dave Pirner (1964), American songwriter, singer, and producer
 Gitti Pirner (1943), German classical pianist
 Juergen Pirner (1956), German computer scientist
 Maximilian Pirner (1853–1924), Czech painter

German-language surnames
German toponymic surnames